Cosmosoma cincta is a moth of the family Erebidae. It was described by William Schaus in 1894. It is found in Venezuela.

References

cincta
Moths described in 1894